Savadogo is a surname. Notable people with the surname include:

 Aminata Savadogo (born 1993), Latvian singer
 Filippe Savadogo, Burkinabe film critic and politician
 Moussa Savadogo, Burkinabé writer and playwright
 Moussa Savadogo (athlete) (born 1959), Malian sprinter
Surnames of Burkinabé origin

Surnames of Malian origin